Mayodendron is a monotypic genus in the flowering plant family Bignoniaceae. The single species it contains, Mayodendron igneum, is native to southern China, India, Laos, Myanmar, and Vietnam. It is sometimes included within Radermachera.

It is a deciduous tree that grows up to 20 m in height and has striking orange-colored flowers that grow straight from the trunk.

This tree is the provincial tree of Chiang Rai Province, Thailand. It is also the tree of Suranaree University of Technology.

References

External links 
 Rare and unusual plants - Radermachera ignea
Rare tropical plants

Bignoniaceae
Flora of China
Flora of Indo-China
Monotypic Lamiales genera
Bignoniaceae genera